Back On Track is an album by country singer Billy "Crash" Craddock. It was released in 1989 on Atlantic Records.

Track listing
Big River to Cross
Love Night
To Love Somebody
Life's Too Short (To Hurt This Long)
Some Such Foolishnesses

You Got the Job
Just Another Miserable Day Here in Paradise
I Can't Help It (If I'm Still In Love With You)
Girls That Everybody Knew
What Good Is Falling Asleep
Softly Diana

References 

Billy "Crash" Craddock albums
1989 albums